Eutaxia empetrifolia is a shrub species in the family Fabaceae. The species is endemic to Australia. It occurs in South Australia and the south-west of Western Australia.

References

empetrifolia
Fabales of Australia
Flora of South Australia
Rosids of Western Australia